Sam Bashiry is an Australian businessman and entrepreneur. Bashiry co-founded Broadband Solutions where he was CEO until 2017.

Early life and Career
Sam Bashiry was born in Tehran, Iran. At the age of 10 he came to Australia with his family and spent 2 years living in a detention centre.

Sam Bashiry later went on to study Computer Science at Swinburne University and worked in IT for a number of years prior to co-founding Broadband Solutions.

Sam Bashiry co-founded Broadband Solutions with Brad Hughes in 2005, with an initial investment of $1,000. Within ten years Broadband Solutions was a multi million dollar company, with 25 employees and turnover of $25 million in 2017.

Bashiry stepped down as CEO of Broadband Solutions in 2017 to focus on business expansion, motivational speaking and philanthropy. In 2018, he launched his own co-working space, Jungle Hub, in Melbourne.

Award 
In 2016, Bashiry won Ethnic Business Award in the medium to large business category.

References

Australian businesspeople
Living people
Year of birth missing (living people)
Swinburne University of Technology alumni
Iranian emigrants to Australia
Businesspeople from Tehran